Lau Wah-sum, OBE, GBS JP (born 30 January 1928) is a member of the Liberal Party and was the unofficial member of the Legislative Council of Hong Kong (1991—95).

He is a registered investment adviser, fellow of Hong Kong Society of Accountants (FHKSA) and the Chartered Institute of Management Accountants (FCMA). During the 1970s, Lau was the first Director of Finance of the Mass Transit Railway Corporation.

References

1928 births
Living people
Liberal Party (Hong Kong) politicians
HK LegCo Members 1988–1991
HK LegCo Members 1991–1995